Baruch Fischhoff (born April 21, 1946, Detroit, Michigan) is an American academic who is the Howard Heinz University Professor in the Institute for Politics and Strategy and the Department of Engineering and Public Policy at Carnegie Mellon University. He is an elected member of the (US) National Academy of Sciences and National Academy of Medicine. His research focuses on judgment and decision making, including risk perception and risk Analysis. He has numerous academic books and articles. Fischhoff completed his graduate education at the Hebrew University of Jerusalem under the supervision of Daniel Kahneman and Amos Tversky.

He has been honored with a 'Distinguished Achievement Award' by the Society for Risk Analysis, a Distinguished Scientific Award for an Early Career Contribution to Psychology by the American Psychological Association, an Andrew Carnegie Fellowship, and a Doctorate of Humanities, honoris causa, by Lund University. He has chaired committees of the U.S. Food and Drug Administration, National Academy of Sciences, and Environmental Protection Agency. He is a past president of the Society for Risk Analysis and Society for Judgment and Decision Making.He is a fellow of the American Psychological Association, Association for Psychological Science, Society of Experimental Psychologists and Society for Risk Analysis.
 William Procter Prize for Scientific Achievement (2021)

References

 Carnegie Mellon University (October 2, 2015). "Baruch Fischhoff". Carnegie Mellon University. Archived from the original on October 8, 2015. Retrieved October 2, 2015.
 Leeds University Business School (October 2, 2015). "Baruch Fischhoff". Leeds University. Retrieved October 2, 2015.
 Baruch Fischhoff (2011). "Communicating Risks and Benefits: An Evidence-Based Users's Guide". Retrieved October 2, 2015.
 Baruch Fischhoff (2011). "Judgment and Decision Making". Routledge. Retrieved October 2, 2015.
 Baruch Fischhoff (2011). "Risk: A Very Short Introduction". Oxford University Press. Retrieved October 2, 2015.
 Baruch Fischhoff (2011). "Risk Analysis and Human Behaviour". Routledge. Retrieved October 2, 2015.
 Society for Risk Analysis (1991). "Distinguished Achievement Award". Society for Risk Analysis. Retrieved October 2, 2015.
 King's Centre for Risk Management (October 2, 2015). "Advisory Board". King's College London. Retrieved October 2, 2015.
 Society for Risk Analysis (2004–2005). "Past Officers and Councilors". Society for Risk Analysis. Retrieved October 2, 2015.
 Society for Judgment and Decision Making (1990–1991). "SJDM Presidents". Judgment and Decision Making. Retrieved October 2, 2015.

External links 
Carnegie Mellon University
http://www.cmu.edu/epp/people/faculty/baruch-fischhoff.html

Hebrew University of Jerusalem alumni
Wayne State University alumni
Carnegie Mellon University faculty
Academics of the University of Leeds
Living people
1946 births
Members of the National Academy of Medicine